The RTAF-6 (บ.ทอ.๖) is a Thai training aircraft developed from the Italian SIAI-Marchetti SF.260MT trainer, and built by Thai Aviation Industry.

Specifications

Operators

 Royal Thai Air Force

See also

References

Aircraft manufactured in Thailand